Santipap Siri (born April 4, 1985) is a retired professional footballer from Thailand.

External links
Profile at Thaipremierleague.co.th

1985 births
Living people
Santipap Siri
Santipap Siri
Association football midfielders
Santipap Siri
Santipap Siri
Santipap Siri
Santipap Siri
Santipap Siri
Santipap Siri